Cwm Silicon (Welsh for Silicon Valley) is an epithet applied to a region of South Wales in the far west of Newport that attracted interest and inward investment from the technology sector in the early 2000s.

, the future of the area as an important technological centre was uncertain following the closure of its key LG factory in August 2003. The area is next to the M4 and is a centre for high-technology companies, like much of the M4 corridor.

See also
List of places with 'Silicon' names

References

Districts of Newport, Wales
High-technology business districts in the United Kingdom
Information technology places